Timocrate Aloigi or Democrate Aloisi (1543–1610) was a Roman Catholic prelate who served as Bishop of Cagli (1607–1610).

Biography
Timocrate Aloigi was born in Apecchio, Italy in 1543.
On 14 May 1607, he was appointed during the papacy of Pope Paul V as Bishop of Cagli.
On 20 May 1607, he was consecrated bishop by Marcello Lante della Rovere, Bishop of Todi, with Giovanni Battista del Tufo, Bishop Emeritus of Acerra, and Giovanni Vitelli, Bishop of Carinola, serving as co-consecrators. 
He served as Bishop of Cagli until his death on 17 February 1610.

References

External links and additional sources

17th-century Italian Roman Catholic bishops
Bishops appointed by Pope Paul V
People from the Province of Pesaro and Urbino
1543 births
1610 deaths